Periapta  is a genus of small sea snails, marine gastropod mollusks in the family Epitoniidae, commonly known as wentletraps.

Species
 Periapta gracilis (Verrill, 1880)
 Periapta polygyrella (P. Fischer in Locard, 1897)
 Periapta siapnoi (DuShane, 1977)
 Periapta weili García, 2003

References

 Locard, A., 1897 Mollusques testacés. In: Expéditions scientifiques du Travailleur et du Talisman pendant les années 1880, 1881, 1882, 1883, vol. 1, p. 516 p, 22 pls

External links
 
  Bouchet, P. & Warén, A. (1986). Revision of the Northeast Atlantic bathyal and abyssal Aclididae Eulimidae, Epitonidae (Mollusca, Gastropoda). Bollettino Malacologico. suppl. 2: 297-576
 Gofas, S.; Le Renard, J.; Bouchet, P. (2001). Mollusca. in: Costello, M.J. et al. (eds), European Register of Marine Species: a check-list of the marine species in Europe and a bibliography of guides to their identification. Patrimoines Naturels. 50: 180-213.

Epitoniidae
Gastropod genera